Cristacoxidae is a family of crustaceans belonging to the order Harpacticoida.

Genera:
 Cubanocleta Petkovski, 1977
 Noodtorthopsyllus Lang, 1965

References

Harpacticoida